Changgang Station is an interchange station of Line 2 and Line 8 on the Guangzhou Metro. The underground station is located at the intersection of Changgang Road and Jiangnan Avenue in Haizhu District. It started operation on 25 September 2010.

At its first operation day of the station, the number of passenger frequency was over 220,000, so traffic control was needed at the platforms of Line 2.

Station layout

References

Railway stations in China opened in 2010
Guangzhou Metro stations in Haizhu District